Gifford Grange Jr. (August 26, 1933 – July 1, 2011) was an American politician. He served as a Democratic member for the 25th district of the Florida House of Representatives.

Life and career 
Grange was born in Jacksonville, Florida. He attended United States Naval Academy and the University of Florida.

In 1966, Grange was elected to the Florida House of Representatives. The next year, he was elected as the first representative for the newly-established 25th district. He served until 1968, when he was succeeded by R. Earl Dixon.

Grange died in July 2011 at his summer home in Spruce Pine, North Carolina, at the age of 77.

References 

1933 births
2011 deaths
Politicians from Jacksonville, Florida
Democratic Party members of the Florida House of Representatives
Florida Republicans
20th-century American politicians
University of Florida alumni